Astyris rosacea, common name the rosy northern dovesnail, is a species of sea snail, a marine gastropod mollusc in the family Columbellidae, the dove snails.

Description

Distribution
This marine species occurs in the North Atlantic Ocean from Greenland to New Jersey, in European waters and in the Beaufort Sea off Alaska.

References

External links

Columbellidae
Gastropods described in 1840